Yves-Gérard Illouz (also known as Gérard Illiouz; September 12, 1929 – January 21, 2015) was a French surgeon who developed safer methods of liposuction. He was a co-founder of Médecins Sans Frontières (Doctors Without Borders).


Early life and education
Illouz was born in Oran, at the time of his birth part of the colony of French Algeria. He studied in France, earning a bachelor's degree in arts and philosophy and in 1968 a medical degree as General Surgeon from the Medical College of Paris.

Career
In the late 1970s, Illouz developed a safer and easier method of liposuction. His "Illouz Method", introduced in 1982 and first published in Annales de Chirurgie Plastique in 1984, was a "wet method" using blunt cannulas, rather than sharp, and of smaller size than previously, in order to minimise bleeding while injecting saline solution into the subcutaneous fat deposits, breaking up the fat for extraction by suction. He referred to his method of aspiration as "collassoplasty". He published La Sculpture chirurgicale par Lipoplastie in 1988. He was not admitted to the French society of plastic surgeons until 1989.

In 1972 Illouz was a co-founder of Médecins Sans Frontières. In 2010 he established the Illouz Foundation for the study of adipose-derived stem cell therapy.

Personal life
Illouz had two sons.

References

Further reading
À la recherche d'Aphrodite: mémoires d'un Pygmalion, Lyon, 2012, . Autobiography.

1929 births
2015 deaths
French plastic surgeons
People from Oran
20th-century French physicians
21st-century French physicians
People of French Algeria
University of Paris alumni
Médecins Sans Frontières
20th-century surgeons